Henry Stoddard Babcock (December 15, 1890 – June 5, 1965) was an American pole vaulter who won the gold medal at the 1912 Summer Olympics, setting an Olympic record at 3.95 meters.

Babcock started as a long jumper, and only around 1910 changed to the pole vault. He graduated in engineering from Columbia University in 1912, and later worked as a salesman with a lumber company in Irvington, New York.

References

External links

Profile on databaseOlympics.com

1890 births
1965 deaths
People from Pelham Manor, New York
Sportspeople from Westchester County, New York
American male pole vaulters
Athletes (track and field) at the 1912 Summer Olympics
Olympic gold medalists for the United States in track and field
Columbia School of Engineering and Applied Science alumni
Medalists at the 1912 Summer Olympics
Olympic decathletes